H. M. (His Majesty) The King's Medal, earlier known as the Court Medal, is a Swedish honour that may be bestowed upon Swedish and foreign citizens. The medal was created in 1814 and is awarded in different sizes in gold and silver with chain or ribbon. This medal is not awarded in classes but in sizes. The 12th size is the largest and is worn around the neck on a chain or ribbon. The 8th and 5th size are worn from the left breast suspended by a ribbon, after the Seraphim Medal.

It is awarded to Swedish and foreign citizens for special merits as well as to officials at the royal court. Since 1975 it is the next highest award, after the Seraphim Medal, that can be awarded to Swedish citizens because the Royal Order of the Seraphim is only for the royal family.

Medals
H.M. The King's Medal is awarded in various sizes in both gold and silver. It may be suspended from a ribbon or chain. Swedish medals are not awarded in classes but are awarded in sizes. This scale assigns various sizes to medals. For example, the 12th size medal is 43 mm in diameter, while the 8th size is 31 mm in diameter. The medal may be awarded in the following sizes and suspensions:

 12th size gold medal with diamonds worn around the neck on a chain of gold (silver-gilt)
 12th size gold medal worn around the neck on a chain of gold (silver-gilt)
 12th size gold (silver-gilt) medal worn around the neck on the Order of the Seraphim ribbon
 12th size gold (silver-gilt) medal worn around the neck on a blue ribbon
 8th size gold (silver-gilt) medal worn on the chest suspended by the Order of the Seraphim ribbon
 8th size gold (silver-gilt) medal worn on the chest suspended by a blue ribbon
 8th size silver medal worn on the chest suspended by a blue ribbon

Notable recipients
12th size gold medal with diamonds in chain

 Princess Christina, Mrs. Magnuson
12th size gold medal with chain
Thorbjörn Fälldin
Johan Hederstedt
Alf Svensson
Stig Synnergren
Håkan Syrén
Alice Trolle-Wachtmeister
Bertil Werkström
Carl Bildt
Sverker Göranson
12th size gold medal on Seraphim Order ribbon
Adolf H. Lundin
Anitra Steen
Alice Trolle-Wachtmeister

12th size gold medal on Bright-Blue ribbon
 Niklas Zennström

References

Orders, decorations, and medals of Sweden
Awards established in 1814
1814 establishments in Sweden